is a side-scrolling shooter video game developed and published by Konami. The first game in the Gradius series, it was originally released as a coin-operated arcade game in 1985. The player maneuvers a spacecraft known as the Vic Viper that must defend itself from the various alien enemies. The game uses a power-up system called the "power meter", based upon collecting capsules to purchase additional weapons.

The arcade version of Gradius was initially released internationally outside Japan under the title of Nemesis, but subsequent home releases have since used the original title. During development, it had the working title Scramble 2, as it was originally intended to be a follow-up to Konami's earlier shooter Scramble (1981). Home versions were released for various platforms, such as the Famicom/NES, the MSX home computer, and the PC Engine. It was a major success in 1986, becoming the year's highest-grossing arcade game in London and one of Japan's top five table arcade games, while the Famicom port sold over a million copies in Japan that year.

Gradius was critically acclaimed for its gameplay and unique power-up system. Along with Namco's Xevious, it is cited as being one of the most important shooter games, having paved the way for many similar games to follow.

Gameplay

The player controls the trans-dimensional spaceship Vic Viper and must battle waves of enemies through various environments. The game became synonymous with the phrase, "Destroy the core!", as the standard of boss battles in the Gradius series involved combat with a giant craft, in the center of which would be situated one to several blue colored spheres. These bosses would be designed in such a way that there would be a straight passage from the exterior of the giant craft which leads directly to one of these cores. The player must fire shots into this passage while avoiding attack patterns from weapon emplacements on the body of the boss. However, small but destructible walls are situated in this passage, impeding the bullet shots from damaging the core, and must be whittled away by repeated well-placed shots. In a way, these tiny walls represent the boss' shielding gauge until its core is finally vulnerable to attack. Some bosses can regenerate these walls. When the core has sustained enough hits, it usually changes color from blue to red, indicating that it is in critical condition and its destruction is imminent. Upon the destruction of a core, a piece of the boss may be put out of commission, seeing that it is no longer powered by a core, or if all of the cores are destroyed, the entire boss is defeated and explodes satisfyingly. Note that these cores are not present on the more organic bosses of Gradius. Such bosses have weak spots in places such as a mouth, head or eye.

When gameplay begins, the Vic Viper is relatively slow and has only a weak gun. This level of capability is generally insufficient for engaging enemies, but the Vic Viper can gain greater capabilities by collecting and using power-up items. While most arcade games utilize distinct power up-items that each correspond to a specific effect on the player character, Gradius has a single power-up item. The effect of this power-up item is to advance the currently selected item in a power-up menu that appears at the bottom of the screen. When the desired power-up is highlighted, the player can obtain it by pressing the power-up button, returning the menu to its initial state in which no power-up is highlighted.

Development
Gradius was the creation of Konami game designer Machiguchi Hiroyasu, being the first video game he publicly released. Joining the company in the early 1980s originally as a programmer, Konami was trying to transition from being a producer of medal machines to a video game developer and assigned him to a small team to try and create a game that could put the company on the map. He asked the team what kind of game they'd like to work on, responding that they'd like to make another shooting game. The shoot'em up genre had seen a resurgence at the time with Namco's Xevious, with the goal of the project being to make a shooter that could surpass it. The project was at first intended to be a followup to Konami's earlier game Scramble (1981), being titled Scramble 2 and reusing many of its material and game mechanics.

Development of Gradius lasted for about a year, which Hiroyasu says was filled with anxiety and worry from the production team due to it being their first game, lacking confidence in what they were doing. Members of the project came up with ideas that were then tested on the arcade monitor to see if they worked or not. While designing the Option satellites, the team tested over 20 different movement patterns for them, which were cut through the process of elimination based on those that didn't work. The game was produced for the Konami Bubble System 16-bit arcade hardware, which gave the team more hardware capacity and memory to experiment with. Hiroyasu wanted the game to have a visually distinct world with unique enemies and locations, something relatively uncommon for shooters at the time. Inspiration for mechanics and the story were derived from films such as Star Wars: A New Hope and Lensman, with the Laser weapon being directly taken from those in Lensman. The idea for the power meter mechanic stemmed from the team's desire to give players the freedom to select whichever weapons they pleased. Early versions had the player collecting individual pick-up icons, which were cut for not being "satisfying" enough; it was instead replaced with a selection bar where players collected capsules to allow access to other weapons, an idea based on the function keys on a keyboard. The Moai enemies were added to pay homage to Xevious and its Nazca lines, and as a way to give the game a sense of mystery.

Releases

Arcade
Gradius was first released in Japan for Konami's Bubble System, an arcade board which allows operators to change the software through the use of proprietary "Bubble Software" cartridge media based on magnetic bubble memory. The game was distributed as a standard printed circuit board in North America and Europe under the title of Nemesis. The North American version of Nemesis features a considerably increased difficulty compared to the Japanese and European version. To balance this, the game spawns a fleet of orange enemies when the player loses a life to provide as many power-up capsules as possible to recover as many upgrades as possible. Also the North American version presents a continue feature (but only for three times). The title screen was also updated, showing an in-game reproduction of the promotional artwork behind the logo.

Famicom/NES
The first home conversion of Gradius was released for Nintendo's Famicom console on April 25, 1986, in Japan. Due to the hardware limitations of the Famicom, many of the level designs were simplified (the Moai stage, for example, lacks the vertical scrolling present in the arcade game) and the maximum amount of options that the player can upgrade to was reduced from four to two. This version added a cheat code that can be entered while the game is paused that grants the player's ship almost all the power-ups. This code would appear again in many later Konami on the NES and other consoles (such as Contra and Life Force), becoming known as the Konami Code.

The NES version of Gradius was released in North America in December 1986. It is the first NES game to have been released by Konami in the region and unlike the original arcade game, the title was kept unchanged between regions. The NES version was made available in arcades as a Nintendo VS. System board (under the title of VS. Gradius) and as a PlayChoice-10 cartridge. VS. Gradius was distributed to arcades by Nintendo.

MSX
The MSX version of Gradius was released on July 25, 1986, in Japan, a few months after the Famicom version. It was also released in Europe under the Nemesis title. This version changed similar to the Famicom version but adds its slew of exclusive content to make up for the downgrade. A new stage, the bone planet was added between the Inverted Volcano stage and the Antennoid stage, featuring exclusive enemy types. There also four hidden warp zones and the ability to play as the titular ship from TwinBee if the MSX version of that game is played alongside Nemesis.

PC Engine
The PC Engine version of Gradius was released on November 15, 1991, exclusively in Japan. Released on a 2-Megabit HuCard, it had relatively few omissions compared to the NES and MSX versions and added a Desert Planet stage similar to the Bone Planet stage from the MSX version. Because of the lower resolution of the PC Engine compared to the original arcade hardware, the PC Engine features some slight vertical-scrolling.

Other platforms
In addition to the MSX, Gradius was also ported to other microcomputers shortly after its release, such as the ZX Spectrum, Amstrad CPC and Commodore 64 in Europe (as Nemesis: The Final Challenge), as well as the PC-8801 and X1 in Japan. A port for the X68000 computer was also included in the early models of the computer.

The original Gradius is also included in collection such as Gradius Deluxe Pack for the PlayStation and Sega Saturn and Gradius Collection for the PlayStation Portable. The arcade version was digitally released on the PlayStation 4 in 2015 and Nintendo Switch in July 2020 as part of the Arcade Archives series, with the option to play all four regional variants of the game. It is also included in the Arcade Classics Anniversary Collection released in 2019 by Konami themselves for  PlayStation 4, Xbox One,  Nintendo Switch and personal computers.

Audio
Alfa Records released a limited-edition soundtrack album for this game (Konami Game Music Vol.1 – 28XA-85) on 27 June 1986.
Apollon Music released a limited-edition soundtrack album for this game (Original Sound of Gradius – KHY1016) on 5 May 1987.
 Also, disc 1 of Konami Music Masterpiece Collection, which was released on October 1, 2004, is mostly devoted to Gradius.

Reception

Arcade
In Japan, Game Machine listed Gradius on their July 1, 1985 issue as being the most-popular arcade game for the previous two weeks. It went on to be Japan's fifth highest-grossing table arcade game of 1986. In the United Kingdom, Nemesis was the highest-grossing arcade game of 1986 on London's Electrocoin charts.

Upon release, the arcade game received positive reviews from Computer and Video Games and Computer Gamer magazines.

Ports
The Famicom version sold over one million copies in Japan during 1986. The home computer port went to number 2 in the UK sales charts, below Feud. The PC Engine version also topped the UK's PC Engine sales chart in December 1991.

The first Famitsu Best Hit Game Awards gave the Famicom version of Gradius the award for Best Shooting Game and listed it as the second best Game of the Year (just below Dragon Quest). Computer and Video Games reviewed the home computer conversions and awarded it Game of the Month.

GameSpot later stated that Gradius was one of the toughest side-scrolling shooter games available on the NES, second only to Contra. IGN gave the Wii Virtual Console re-release a rating 7 out of 10 and has hailed it as one of the greatest classic side-scrolling shooter games.

Legacy
Gradius spawned several sequels, the first of which was 1986's Salamander. The series has continued into the seventh generation with Gradius ReBirth.

It was also re-released on Windows Store on December 20, 2013, GameNow in May 2014 and for PlayStation 4's Arcade Archives on January 25 in Japan. Another updated release titled Gradius SP: Second Loop was released worldwide on August 22, 2019.

Notes

References

External links

1985 video games
Konami games
Arcade video games
Amstrad CPC games
Commodore 64 games
Gradius video games
Mobile games
MSX games
Multiplayer and single-player video games
NEC PC-8801 games
Nintendo Entertainment System games
Nintendo Vs. Series games
PlayChoice-10 games
PlayStation 4 games
Sharp X1 games
X68000 games
TurboGrafx-16 games
Video games scored by Miki Higashino
Virtual Console games
Virtual Console games for Wii U
Nintendo Switch games
Windows games
ZX Spectrum games
Konami arcade games
Nintendo Switch Online games
Video games developed in Japan
Video games set on fictional planets
Video games set in outer space
Hamster Corporation games